Arona railway station serves the town and comune of Arona, in the Piedmont region, northwestern Italy.

The station is part of the Lombard railway service, with local and direct connections with Milan.

Railway stations in Piedmont
Railway stations opened in 1905
1905 establishments in Italy
Railway stations in Italy opened in the 20th century